Riverview Park is a park in San Jose, California, located along the Guadalupe River in the Rincon district of North San Jose

History

The park was laid out and dedicated in 2015.

A pedestrian bridge connects the park to the historic James Lick Mansion across the Guadalupe River, the 19th century estate built by local land baron James Lick who was the wealthiest man in California, at the time of his death in 1870.

Location
Riverview Park is a large riverside park located on the eastern bank of the Guadalupe River, in the Rincon district of North San Jose

The Guadalupe River Trail passes along the park's edge with the river.

It is located within walking distance of the River Oaks station on the VTA light rail.

See also
North San Jose

References

External links

Parks in San Jose, California